Eremias dzungarica (commonly known as the Dzungarian racerunner) is a species of lizard found in Mongolia.

References

Eremias
Reptiles of Mongolia
Endemic fauna of Mongolia
Reptiles described in 2017
Taxa named by Valentina F. Orlova
Taxa named by Nikolay A. Poyarkov Jr.
Taxa named by Marina A. Chirikova
Taxa named by Roman A. Nazarov
Taxa named by Munkhbayar Munkhbaatar
Taxa named by Khorlooghiyn Munkhbayar
Taxa named by Khayankhayrvagijn Terbish